Kandace Gayle Krueger Matthews (born May 27, 1976) is an American journalist, singer, TV Host and beauty pageant titleholder who won Miss USA 2001 and represented the United States in the Miss Universe 2001 where she placed second runner-up. She is the daughter of Larry and Barbara Johnson Krueger, and was born and raised in Austin, Texas.

Pageants

Miss Texas USA 
Krueger started competing in local Miss Texas USA pageants as an eighteen-year-old, placing in the top five but not winning.  She won her first local title, Miss Williamson County USA, in 1999 and her second, Miss Austin USA, in 2000.  Krueger competed in the Miss Texas USA pageant numerous times in 1990s without placing, although she came close to making the top twelve in 1999 at the Miss Texas  USA 2000 pageant.  In 2000, her first appearance in the pageant semi-finalis, Krueger won the Miss Texas USA 2001 title.

Miss USA 
Krueger represented Texas in the Miss USA 2001 pageant broadcast live from Gary, Indiana in March 2001.  She made the semi-finals, becoming the first Texan to make the top ten in three years, placed second in the swimsuit competition (9.38) and fourth in the evening gown competition (9.29).  She entered the top five in second place, with an average combined score of 9.33.  After the final interview round she was ranked second, but went on to win the pageant.
 
During her homecoming in Texas, she was given the key to the city of Austin, presented to the Senate, and met with governor Rick Perry.

Miss Universe - second runner up
As Miss USA, Krueger earned the right to represent the United States at the Miss Universe 2001 Pageant in Bayamón, Puerto Rico, where she finished as second runner-up, ahead of Celina Jaitley of India and Eva Ekvall of Venezuela and behind Evelina Papantoniou of Greece and winner Denise Quiñones of Puerto Rico.  She placed third in the swimsuit competition (9.37) and fourth in evening gown (9.45).

Career and family 
Prior to Miss USA, Krueger attended Texas A&M and studied journalism.  Her ambition was to become a sports newsbroadcaster. She was given the chance to be a presenter for the Miss USA 2002 broadcast.

She is currently the host of the weekday TV show Today with Kandace broadcast in Dallas, TX.

References

External links

1976 births
Living people
Miss Universe 2001 contestants
Miss USA 2001 delegates
Miss USA winners
People from Austin, Texas
People from College Station, Texas
American people of German descent
Texas A&M University alumni